Donghae station is a railway station in Donghae City in Gangwon Province, South Korea. Donghae station is on the Yeongdong Line, the Samcheok Line, the Mukhohang Line, and the Bukpyeong Line.

External links
 Cyber station information from Korail

Railway stations in Gangwon Province, South Korea
Donghae City
Railway stations opened in 1940